Johnson Fry (November 21, 1901 – April 7, 1959), nicknamed "Jay", was a Major League Baseball pitcher who played with the Cleveland Indians for one season. He pitched in one game during the 1923 Cleveland Indians season on August 24, 1923. A single in his only at-bat left him with a rare MLB career batting average of 1.000.

Fry died on April 7, 1959.

External links

1901 births
1959 deaths
Baseball players from West Virginia
Cleveland Indians players
Major League Baseball pitchers
Marshall Thundering Herd baseball players
Sportspeople from Huntington, West Virginia